Graeae Theatre Company, often abbreviated to just Graeae (pronounced "grey-eye") is a British organisation composed of deaf and disabled artists and theatre makers. As well as producing theatre which it tours nationally and internationally to traditional theatres and outdoor spaces, Graeae run a large and varied Creative Learning and training programme for emerging, young and mid-career deaf and disabled artists.

Graeae was founded in 1980 by Nabil Shaban and Richard Tomlinson, who named the company after the Graeae of Greek mythology. In 1981 the company was offered the use of an office, rehearsal space and facilities for 18 months by the West End Centre, an Arts Centre in Aldershot in Hampshire. During that year, the Company became eligible to receive full funding from the Arts Council of Great Britain. Graeae are currently a National Portfolio Organisation of Arts Council England.

In 1984 the Graeae Theatre Company won a Special Award in the Evening Standard Awards, and has since won numerous awards, including the Promotion of Diversity Award at the UK Theatre Awards 2012. It also won the Euan's Guide Most Accessible Production for Jack Thorne's The Solid Life of Sugar Water at the 2015 Edinburgh Festival Fringe.

Jenny Sealey MBE has been artistic director and CEO since 1997, and Amit Sharma joined as associate director in 2011. Nickie Miles-Wildin took over the role of associate director in 2019.

During the COVID-19 pandemic, while live theatres were closed in the UK, the company produced two series of short video plays written by disabled artists entitled Crips Without Constraints. The first series were monologues while the second series were two-person plays. In March 2021, the company announced that an archival recording of their 2017 co-production of The House of Bernarda Alba with the Royal Exchange Theatre would be made available online for a limited time.

Repertoire
Actors who have appeared with the company include Nadia Albina, Genevieve Barr, Laurence Clark, Mat Fraser, Beth Hinton-Lever, Arthur Hughes, Cherylee Houston, Melissa Johns, John Kelly, Garry Robson, Nabil Shaban and Kiruna Stamell.

Graeae has produced plays by Jack Thorne, Sarah Kane, Jackie Hagan, Jo Clifford, David Ireland, Kaite O'Reilly, Lorca, Paul Sirett, Glyn Cannon and Sam Boardman-Jacobs.

Graeae has performed at the National Theatre, Edinburgh Festival Fringe, Birmingham Repertory Theatre, Soho Theatre, Theatre Royal Stratford East, Traverse Theatre Edinburgh, Dundee Rep, Derby Theatre and Royal Exchange Theatre, Manchester.

See also

Diorama Arts Cooperative

References

External links
Graeae Theatre Company website

Theatre companies in the United Kingdom
Disability theatre
1980 establishments in the United Kingdom
Arts organizations established in 1980
Disability organisations based in the United Kingdom